Giorgos Koudas (born 23 November 1946) is a Greek former professional footballer who played as an attacking midfielder. He spent his entire career in PAOK. Due to his fierce competitiveness and his Macedonian heritage, his nickname was Alexander the Great.

Playing career

Club
Born in Agios Pavlos, Thessaloniki, Koudas began playing football for PAOK where he made his first-team debut in December 1963, aged 17. Koudas, nicknamed Alexander the Great, spent his entire football career with PAOK, making 504 appearances in the Alpha Ethniki from 1963 to 1984, and 607 appearances in all competitions (PAOK all-time records). Koudas won two out of nine Greek Cup finals he appeared in and in the 1972 Cup final, he scored both goals as PAOK defeated Panathinaikos 2–1 and earned their first domestic title in club's history.

During the summer of 1966, Olympiacos unsuccessfully tried to acquire Koudas from PAOK, approaching him directly without going into a negotiation with his club. PAOK president Giorgos Pantelakis never gave his consent for the transfer to be completed and for the next two seasons, Koudas participated only in Olympiacos friendly games. In the summer of 1968, he returned to PAOK and led the great team of the 1970s to glorious days. Fueled by this incident, Olympiacos–PAOK rivalry is considered nowadays the fiercest intercity football rivalry in Greece.

He retired in 1984, aged 37, serving for over 20 years at PAOK.

Koudas became even inspiration for a popular song by the Greek songwriter and PAOK supporter Nikos Papazoglou and lyricist Manolis Rasoulis.

International
Koudas made 43 appearances for the Greece national team, scoring four goals, between 1967 and 1982. He appeared at UEFA Euro 1980 in Italy, along with PAOK teammates Konstantinos Iosifidis, Ioannis Damanakis, Ioannis Gounaris and Georgios Kostikos.

After he had retired, Koudas made a final appearance for the national team in a friendly against Yugoslavia on 20 September 1995. That made him the oldest international player (at age 48) until George Weah (at age 51) beat the record in September 2018.

Managerial career
Koudas had a short managerial career as the co-manager of Iraklis together with Kostas Aidiniou.

Honours
PAOK
Alpha Ethniki: 1975–76
Greek Cup: 1971–72, 1973–74

See also
List of one-club men in association football

References

External links
Melbourne Club PAOK - Giorgos Koudas Statistics The Official PAOK Thessaloniki Supporters Club PAOK of Australia

1946 births
Living people
Footballers from Thessaloniki
Greek Macedonians
Greek footballers
Association football midfielders
Greece international footballers
UEFA Euro 1980 players
PAOK FC players
PAOK FC non-playing staff
Super League Greece players
Greek football managers
Iraklis Thessaloniki F.C. managers